Dune (titled onscreen as Dune: Part One) is a 2021 American epic science fiction film directed by Denis Villeneuve and written by Villeneuve, Jon Spaihts, and Eric Roth. It is the first of a two-part adaptation of the 1965 novel of the same name by Frank Herbert, primarily covering the first half of the book. Set in the far future, the film follows Paul Atreides as his family, the noble House Atreides, is thrust into a war for the deadly and inhospitable desert planet Arrakis. The ensemble cast includes Timothée Chalamet, Rebecca Ferguson, Oscar Isaac, Josh Brolin, Stellan Skarsgård, Dave Bautista, Stephen McKinley Henderson, Zendaya, David Dastmalchian, Chang Chen, Sharon Duncan-Brewster, Charlotte Rampling, Jason Momoa, and Javier Bardem.

Originally scheduled for a late 2020 release, Dune was delayed by the COVID-19 pandemic. The film premiered the following year at the 78th Venice International Film Festival on September 3, 2021, ahead of its international release on September 15, 2021. It was then released in simultaneous in United States theaters, in 3D, RealD 3D, Dolby Cinema, IMAX, and 4DX formats, and streaming on HBO Max on October 22, 2021. It received universal acclaim from critics with praise for its visuals, scope, and ambition, and was a box-office success, grossing $400 million worldwide against on a production budget of $165 million, as of February 2, 2022. Organizations like the National Board of Review and the American Film Institute named Dune as one of the top 10 films of 2021, and it received 10 nominations at the 94th Academy Awards, including Best Picture, Best Adapted Screenplay, and Best Cinematography, among numerous other awards and nominations, mainly for score and technical innovation. For the score of Dune, Zimmer won his second Academy Award for Best Original Score almost thirty years after his first win.

Accolades

Notes

References

External links
 

Lists of accolades by film
Dune (franchise)